David Loder (born in Stow-on-the-Wold, Gloucestershire, England) is a trainer of Thoroughbred racehorses.

He began his professional career in Newmarket in 1992 and trained for thirteen years including for Godolphin Racing, where he trained Dubai Millennium before retiring in 2005.

Loder retired after suffering from a virus that prevented him from training as well as he had previously.

References

 David Loder at the NTRA

Living people
British racehorse trainers
People from Stow-on-the-Wold
People educated at Eton College
Sportspeople from Gloucestershire
Year of birth missing (living people)